Varzaq Rural District is a rural district (dehestan) in the Central District of Faridan County, Isfahan Province, Iran. At the 2006 census, its population was 13,055, in 3,354 families.  The rural district has 11 villages.

References 

Rural Districts of Isfahan Province
Faridan County